Cat Island, Rum Cay and San Salvador is a parliamentary constituency represented in the House of Assembly of the Bahamas. It elects one Member of Parliament using the first-past-the-post voting method. The Incumbent Member of Parliament is Philip "Brave" Davis, who serves as Prime Minister of the Bahamas and Leader of the Progressive Liberal Party (PLP).

Members of Parliament

Electoral history

References

Constituencies of the Bahamas